This Is the Life is the debut studio album by Scottish singer-songwriter Amy Macdonald, released on 30 July 2007. It reached number one on the UK Albums Chart on 13 January 2008 and sold over 900,000 copies in the UK as of February 2017, awarding the album a certification of 3× Platinum.

Singles and other tracks
The first single from the album was "Poison Prince", a limited online release, while the debut first full single was the successful "Mr Rock & Roll", which debuted at number 12. The following singles "L.A." and "This Is the Life" were considerably less successful in the UK, although "This Is the Life" is considered her most successful song in the rest of Europe, where it peaked at number 1 in Belgium and the Netherlands, number 2 in Switzerland, number 3 in Spain, number 6 in Norway and number 8 in Denmark. It peaked at number 28 in the UK, spending 17 weeks in the top 75. After fifth single "Run", the sixth release from the album was a re-release of "Poison Prince" on 19 May 2008.

Three songs of the album are cover versions: "Caledonia", originally recorded in 1979 by Dougie MacLean, "Fairytale of New York", first performed in 1987 by The Pogues and Kirsty MacColl, written by Jem Finer and Shane MacGowan, and "Mr. Brightside", cover version of a 2004 song by The Killers, written by Brandon Flowers and Dave Keuning.

United Kingdom
 "Poison Prince" (7 May 2007)
 "Mr Rock & Roll" (16 July 2007)
 "L.A." (15 October 2007)
 "This Is the Life" (10 December 2007)
 "Run" (3 March 2008)
 "Poison Prince" (19 May 2008 – re-release)
Europe
 "Mr Rock & Roll" (5 August 2008)
 "This Is the Life"
 "Run" (20 February 2009)
 "Poison Prince" (19 June 2009)
Poland
 "Poison Prince"
 "This Is the Life"
 "Mr Rock & Roll"
Canada and US
 "Mr Rock & Roll" (5 August 2008)

Chart performance
The album was particularly successful in Germany, spending 57 weeks in the top 20 of the German Albums Chart, 36 weeks in the top 10 of the German albums chart and a total of 100 weeks on the entire chart; it has been certified 5× Platinum (as 2012) for over 1.000,000 copies sold in the country. It also spent 57 weeks in the Dutch albums chart and 53 weeks in the Swiss albums chart.

It has also been certified Gold in Sweden. It has been certified Platinum in France for over 220,000 copies sold. The album was released in the US on 19 August 2008.

Track listings
All tracks were written by Amy Macdonald except where shown.

Standard edition

Deluxe edition
After the major success of "This Is the Life" across Europe, near the end of 2008 a deluxe version of the album was released. The two-disc set include the standard version of the album and a bonus CD with several bonus tracks, live and acoustic versions.

Personnel
Amy Macdonald – vocals, acoustic guitar
Pete Wilkinson – producer, manager
Seton Daunt – guitar
Jolyon Dixon – guitar, mixing
Jamie Sefton – bass
Adam Falkner – drums, percussion
Johnny Dyke – keyboards
Phillip Read Mason – bagpipes
Audrey Riley – cello, conductor
Richard George – violin
Jonathan Hill – violin
Laura Melhuish – violin
Susan Dench – viola
Joe Fields – engineer
Paul Adam & His Mayfair Music – executive producer
Guy Katsav – assistant engineer
Danton Supple and Bob Clearmountain – mixing
Valerie Phillips – cover design, photography

Charts

Weekly charts

Year-end charts

Certifications

References

External links
 Amy Macdonald's official website
 This Is the Life Lyrics

2007 debut albums
Amy Macdonald albums
Vertigo Records albums